Vesperus joanivivesi is a species of brown coloured beetle in the family Vesperidae that is endemic to Spain.

References

Vesperidae
Beetles described in 1998
Endemic fauna of Spain
Beetles of Europe